José Artur de Lima Junior (born 11 March 1996), commonly known simply as Artur, is a Brazilian professional footballer who plays for MLS club Houston Dynamo as a midfielder. Previously, he played in his native Brazil for São Paulo.

While with the São Paulo U20s, Artur won the Copa do Brasil Sub-20 twice and the 2016 U-20 Copa Libertadores. He appeared sparingly for the São Paulo senior team before departing the club, first on loan and then permanently to Columbus Crew SC in the United States. As a result of his permanent transfer to Columbus, Crew SC owns 50 percent of his rights, while São Paulo hold 20 percent and his former youth club Juventus-SC hold 30 percent.

Club career

São Paulo
Artur came through the youth ranks at Bahia, Juventus-SC, and São Paulo before breaking into the São Paulo first team in 2016. He made his senior debut for the Tricolor on 19 June 2016, part of a 2–2 draw with Flamengo, and his performance was rated highly by the Brazilian press. However, Artur rarely made it off the bench during the rest of the Série A season, and finished the 2016 campaign with just four appearances, all in the Campeonato Brasileiro.

Columbus Crew
After impressing against Major League Soccer club Columbus Crew SC in a preseason match, Artur presently signed on loan with the American side on 13 February 2017. He made his debut for the club on 4 March, a substitute appearance as part of a 1–1, season-opening draw with Chicago Fire. Although Artur had initially appeared to be a depth signing for Crew SC, sitting behind Wil Trapp, Mohammed Abu, and Tony Tchani on the depth chart, he quickly forced his way into the Columbus starting lineup. Artur missed time early in the year after undergoing surgery on his left wrist, but still would end up starting 24 times during the regular season. In the 2017 MLS Cup Playoffs, Artur appeared three times; on 31 October, in the first leg of the conference semifinals against New York City FC, he tallied his first career goal in the 58th minute of a 4–1 Crew SC victory. Artur finished the season with a goal and three assists in 28 total appearances.

Following the season, reports from Brazil claimed that São Paulo wanted Artur to return to Brazil upon the expiry of his loan; although Columbus had an option to buy's Artur's rights, he was reportedly being offered a salary raise in order to entice him to return to the Tricolor. Columbus officially picked up Artur's MLS contract option in early December, while still trying to complete a deal with São Paulo. The transfer was confirmed on 6 December 2017, with Columbus paying $1.5 million for 50 percent of Artur's rights; São Paulo retained 20 percent, with Juventus-SC holding the final 30 percent. He made his second debut for Columbus on 3 March 2018, playing the full ninety minutes in a 2–0 victory over defending MLS Cup champions Toronto FC. Artur was further part of the Columbus squad that won the 2020 MLS Cup, making a total of 27 appearances and playing an instrumental part in Columbus's midfield.

During the 2020 offseason, Artur had sports hernia surgery to combat the lingering issue that he had since his arrival to Columbus. On August 2, 2021, the club had announced that Artur had undergone a second hernia surgery, which limited him to appear in just 6 league matches during the 2021 MLS season.

Houston Dynamo
On November 22, 2022, Artur was traded  to Houston Dynamo in exchange for $300,000 in General Allocation Money

Personal life
Artur's brother, Norberto, is a fellow professional footballer who plays as a right back.

Career statistics

Honors

Columbus Crew 

 MLS Cup (1): 2020

References

External links

 Columbus profile
 
 

Living people
1996 births
People from Brumado
Brazilian footballers
Association football midfielders
São Paulo FC players
Columbus Crew players
Houston Dynamo FC players
Campeonato Brasileiro Série A players
Major League Soccer players
Brazilian expatriate footballers
Brazilian expatriate sportspeople in the United States
Expatriate soccer players in the United States
Sportspeople from Bahia